The 2015 Indian Ocean Island Games, officially known as Jeux des îles de l'océan Indien Réunion 2015 or simply JIOI Réunion 2015, was the 9th edition of this multi-sport event for athletes representing the National Olympic Committees of Indian Ocean island nations. It was held in La Réunion from August 1 – August 9, 2015.

Organisation

Venues

The Games

Participating IOCs
Over 2,000 athletes, from 7 countries, participated in the 2015 Indian Ocean Island Games.

The Comoros were to participate but withdrew, protesting the waving of the French flag and singing of the French national anthem for the Mayotte team.

Sports
A total of 14 sports were represented in the 2015 Indian Ocean Island Games.

  Athletics (62)
  Badminton (5)
  Basketball (2)
  Boxing (10)
  Cycling (3)
  Football (2)
  Handball (1)
  Judo (24)
  Sailing (9)
  Swimming (20)
  Table tennis (14)
  Tennis (4)
  Volleyball (2)
  Weightlifting (15)

Medal table

References

External links 

 Official website

Indian Ocean Island Games
Indian Ocean Island Games
Indian Ocean Island Games